Brigadier Abdul Qayum Sher  (15 May 1919 – 26 August 2013) was an officer of the Pakistani Army.

Early life and education
Abdul Qayum Sher was born into the prominent Shinwari tribe of Pathans. His father Khan Mohammed Azam Khan was an engineer with the Indian Civil Service, who became Permanent Secretary in the Department of Public Works after the Partition of India.

As a child, Abdul Qayum Sher was sent first to Switzerland and then on to Durham in England, where he attended Durham School (1935–38) and then Durham College. He participated in sports and was active in the rowing and rugby teams at school level.

Military career
Abdul Qayum Sher was on a visit to India at the outbreak of World War II, and enrolled into the British Indian Army, attending the Indian Military Academy at Dehradun. He served with distinction in the Burma campaign during the war.

At partition he chose to live in Pakistan, and participated in the capture of Pandu, Kashmir, during hostilities in 1948 with India. He commanded various battalions including his parent 11 Baluch Regiment. He attended the Pakistan Command and Staff College in Quetta and in the Indo-Pakistani War of 1965 was Brigade Commander 22 Brigade on the Lahore front. He led the counterattack force which repelled the Indian attack on Lahore, and captured Indian General N. Prasad's command headquarters (15th Indian Division), leading the attack with his Brigadier insignia and flag on his command jeep. He was awarded the Hilal-i-Jurat for outstanding bravery.

Personal life
In 1945, Abdul Qayum Sher met and married his wife Amita, who was a teacher in Lahore, and later became a social worker and author. They had five children, three of whom are still alive.

After retirement he volunteered for the Pakistan Society for the Rehabilitation of the Disabled (PSRD), and worked there until weeks before his death in 2013.

Awards and decorations

Foreign Decorations

References

External links
 Pakistan Army Channel

1919 births
2013 deaths
Baloch Regiment officers
Brigadier generals
History of Pakistan
Indian Military Academy alumni
Indo-Pakistani War of 1965
Pakistan Army officers